Anfossi is a surname. Notable people with the surname include:

 Filippo Anfossi (died 1825), Vicar-General of the Dominican Order
 Giuseppe Anfossi (born 1935), Roman Catholic bishop
 Pasquale Anfossi (1727–1797), Italian opera composer
 Vincenzo da Via Anfossi (born 1972), Italian rapper

Surnames of Italian origin